William Mann Clayton (July 14, 1884, London, England – April 5, 1946, New York City) was an American pulp magazine publisher.  His company published Snappy Stories, a men's magazine which was launched in 1912.  He published many western pulps, and in 1930 launched Astounding Stories, which is still being published (as of 2022) under the title Analog Science Fiction and Fact.

Notes

References

External links
Analog Science Fiction and Fact official web site

1884 births
1946 deaths
American pulp magazine publishers (people)
20th-century American businesspeople
British emigrants to the United States